Calliteara flavobrunnea is a moth of the family Erebidae. It was described by Robinson in 1969. It is found on Fiji.

References

Moths described in 1969
Lymantriinae
Moths of Fiji